The 2022 California State Assembly election was held on Tuesday, November 8, 2022, with the primary election being held on June 7, 2022. All of the seats of the California State Assembly were elected as part of the 2022 California elections.

Predictions

Overview

Primary

Election

Summary of Results by State Assembly District

Source:

Retiring incumbents
5th: Frank Bigelow: (R-Madera): Retiring
6th:  Kevin Kiley (R-Rocklin):  Retiring to run for the United States House of Representatives
9th: Jim Cooper (D-Elk Grove): Retiring to run for Sacramento County Sheriff
10th: Marc Levine (D-San Rafael): Retiring to run for state Insurance Commissioner
20th: Bill Quirk (D–Hayward): Retiring
21st: Adam Gray (D–Merced): Retiring to run for U.S. House of Representatives
22nd: Kevin Mullin (D–South San Francisco): Retiring to run for U.S. House of Representatives
29th: Mark Stone (D–Scotts Valley): Retiring
32nd: Rudy Salas (D–Bakersfield): Retiring to run for U.S. House of Representatives
35th: Jordan Cunningham (R–Paso Robles): Retiring
42nd: Chad Mayes (I-Rancho Mirage): Retiring
58th: Cristina Garcia (D-Bell Gardens):  running for the United States House of Representatives
61st: Jose Medina (D-Riverside) Retiring
67th:  Kelly Seyarto (R-Murrieta): retiring to run for the California State Senate
69th: Tom Daly (D-Santa Ana): Retiring
70th: Patrick O'Donnell (D-Long Beach): Retiring
72nd: Janet Nguyen (R-Garden Grove): Retiring to run for the California State Senate

Results

District 1

District 2

District 3

District 4

District 5

District 6

District 7

District 8

District 9

District 10

District 11

District 12

District 13

District 14

District 15

District 16

District 17

District 18

District 19

District 20

District 21

District 22

District 23

District 24

District 25

District 26

District 27

District 28

District 29

District 30

District 31

District 32

District 33

District 34

District 35

District 36

District 37

District 38

District 39

District 40

District 41

District 42

District 43

District 44

District 45

District 46

District 47

District 48

District 49

District 50

District 51

District 52

District 53

District 54

District 55

District 56

District 57

District 58

District 59

District 60

District 61

District 62

District 63

District 64

District 65

District 66

District 67

District 68

District 69

District 70

District 71

District 72

District 73

District 74

District 75

District 76

District 77

District 78

District 79

District 80

See also
 2022 California elections
 2022 United States elections

Notes

References

External links
 Elections Division, The Office of the California Secretary of State.
 The Assembly of the State of California, State of California.
 Officers of the California State Assembly, The Assembly of the State of California.

Assembly
2022
California Assembly